In enzymology, a biphenyl 2,3-dioxygenase is an enzyme that catalyzes the chemical reaction

biphenyl + NADH + H+ + O2  (1S,2R)-3-phenylcyclohexa-3,5-diene-1,2-diol + NAD+

The 4 substrates of this enzyme are biphenyl, NADH, H+, and O2, whereas its two products are (1S,2R)-3-phenylcyclohexa-3,5-diene-1,2-diol and NAD+.

This enzyme belongs to the family of oxidoreductases, specifically those acting on paired donors, with O2 as oxidant and incorporation or reduction of oxygen. The oxygen incorporated need not be derived from O2 with NADH or NADPH as one donor, and incorporation of two atoms o oxygen into the other donor.  The systematic name of this enzyme class is biphenyl,NADH:oxygen oxidoreductase (2,3-hydroxylating). This enzyme is also called biphenyl dioxygenase.  This enzyme participates in biphenyl degradation.

Structural studies

References

 
 
 

EC 1.14.12
NADPH-dependent enzymes
NADH-dependent enzymes
Enzymes of known structure